Thomas Frederick Cole  (born 17 November 1928) is a retired major general in the United States Army who served as Deputy Commanding General of Sixth United States Army from 1984 to 1988. He was commissioned upon graduation from the United States Military Academy in 1952.

References

1928 births
Living people
United States Army generals
United States Military Academy alumni